Pinon High School is a high school in Pinon, Arizona. It is the only high school under the jurisdiction of the Piñon Unified School District, which also includes an elementary and middle school.

References

Public high schools in Arizona
Educational institutions established in 1996
Education on the Navajo Nation
Schools in Navajo County, Arizona
1996 establishments in Arizona